Heba Muhammad Tawfiq Abdel Gawad (born February 15, 1982) is a synchronized swimmer, she represented Egypt at women's duet event in synchronized swimming at two Summer Olympics tournaments; 2000 and 2004. Her twin sister Sara Abdel Gawad is also a synchronized swimmer, they competed together in women's duet event in 2000 Summer Games.

Olympic participation

Sydney 2000

Athena 2004

References 

1982 births
Egyptian synchronized swimmers
Olympic synchronized swimmers of Egypt
Synchronized swimmers at the 2000 Summer Olympics
Synchronized swimmers at the 2004 Summer Olympics
20th-century Egyptian people
Living people